Cryptaspasma is a genus of moths belonging to the subfamily Olethreutinae of the family Tortricidae.

Species
Cryptaspasma achlyoptera Clarke, 1976
Cryptaspasma acrolophoides (Meyrick, 1931)
Cryptaspasma anaphorana (Walsingham, 1914)
Cryptaspasma angulicostana (Walsingham, 1900)
Cryptaspasma anisopis Diakonoff, 1959
Cryptaspasma athymopis Diakonoff, 1959
Cryptaspasma bipenicilla Brown & Brown, 2004
Cryptaspasma brachyptycha (Meyrick, 1911)
Cryptaspasma caryothicta (Meyrick, 1920)
Cryptaspasma debeauforti Diakonoff, 1959
Cryptaspasma geina Diakonoff, 1959
Cryptaspasma glebaecolor Diakonoff, 1959
Cryptaspasma haplophyes Diakonoff, 1959
Cryptaspasma helota (Meyrick, 1905)
Cryptaspasma hesyca Diakonoff, 1959
Cryptaspasma lasiura (Meyrick, 1912)
Cryptaspasma lugubris (Felder & Rogenhofer, 1875)
Cryptaspasma marginifasciatus (Walsingham, 1900)
Cryptaspasma microloga Diakonoff, 1959
Cryptaspasma mirabilis (Kuznetzov, 1964)
Cryptaspasma ochrotricha Diakonoff, 1959
Cryptaspasma orphnina Diakonoff, 1959
Cryptaspasma pelagia Diakonoff, 1959
Cryptaspasma peratra Diakonoff, 1959
Cryptaspasma phycitinana Aarvik, 2005
Cryptaspasma polysticta Clarke, 1976
Cryptaspasma pullatana Bradley, 1982
Cryptaspasma querula (Meyrick, 1912)
Cryptaspasma sordida (Turner, 1945)
Cryptaspasma subtilis Diakonoff, 1959
Cryptaspasma syostoma Diakonoff, 1959
Cryptaspasma trigonana (Walsingham, 1900)
Cryptaspasma triopis Diakonoff, 1959
Cryptaspasma zigzag Diakonoff, 1983
Cryptaspasma zophocosma (Meyrick, 1931)

See also
List of Tortricidae genera

References

External links
tortricidae.com

Microcorsini
Tortricidae genera